Chisocheton maxilla-pisticis is a tree in the family Meliaceae. The specific epithet  is from the Latin meaning "shark jaw", referring to the shape of the young leaves.

Description

Distribution and habitat
Chisocheton maxilla-pisticis is found in Borneo and the Philippines. Its habitat is lowland rain forest.

References

maxilla-pisticis
Trees of Borneo
Trees of the Philippines
Plants described in 2003